Troféu João Saldanha is an award given by the Brazilian newspaper Lance! to the winner of the second half of the Campeonato Brasileiro Série A. The trophy honors João Saldanha, who was a journalist and head coach, deceased on July 12, 1990, during that year's World Cup. The award was created in 2004.

Winners

Titles by team

See also
 Troféu Osmar Santos

References

Brazilian football trophies and awards
Campeonato Brasileiro Série A
Lance!